Katihar Lok Sabha constituency is one of the 40 Lok Sabha (parliamentary) constituencies in Bihar state in eastern India.

Vidhan Sabha segments
Presently, Katihar Lok Sabha constituency comprises the following six Vidhan Sabha (legislative assembly) segments:

Members of Lok Sabha
The following is the list of the Members of Parliament elected from this Lok Sabha constituency:

^ by-poll

Election results

2019 general elections

2014 general elections

2009 general elections

1971 general elections
 Gyaneshwar Prasad Yadav (BJS) : 96,422 votes 	
 Sita Ram Kesri (Congress) : 83,533

See also
 Katihar district 
 List of Constituencies of the Lok Sabha

References

External links
Katihar lok sabha  constituency election 2019 date and schedule

Lok Sabha constituencies in Bihar
Politics of Katihar district